Denver Technological Center, better known as The Denver Tech Center or DTC, is a business and economic trading center located in Colorado in the southeastern portion of the Denver Metropolitan Area, within portions of the cities of Denver and Greenwood Village. It is home to several major businesses and corporations. The DTC roughly corresponds to the area surrounding the I-25 corridor between I-225 and SH 88 (Arapahoe Road) and has a similar business community reputation to Irvine, California.

History

The DTC was established in the early 1970s.  Cable companies United Cablevision, United Artists Cable, and later AT&T Broadband, all had their start in - and still have major infrastructure around - the Denver Tech Center. In the Colorado area, Bill Daniels and John C. Malone were early adopters who shepherded many standards in cable technology still used today.

The Denver Tech Center was designed by architect/planner Carl A. Worthington.  In the early 1970s, investors asked Worthington to complete a conceptual master plan along a new fiber optic line south of downtown Denver.  The master plan started with forty acres, with potential for an additional 800 acres.  The plan has since grown to 850 acres, and over 25 million square feet of buildings have been completed.
The area's progress was a major reason for Denver Regional Council of Governments's T-REX expansion into the Denver Tech Center, which built new light rail lines connecting the Denver Tech Center to downtown Denver.

Notable Denver Tech Center area companies

Agilent Technologies
Air Methods (headquarters), moved to DTC in 2017
Aimco (Apartment Investment Management Company), (Headquarters)
Allied Insurance
Arrow Electronics, Inc.
Booz Allen Hamilton
Boeing
CableLabs, developed cable standards DOCSIS and CableCard
Charter Communications
CH Robinson
Ciber
Comcast
Cordell & Cordell
DHL Express
Dow Jones & Company, Inc.
Eide Bailly LLP
Empower Retirement
Envivio
Fidelity Investments
Gold Fields Ltd, Gold Fields Exploration, Inc.
Great-West Life
HP
ICG Communications
Jacobs Engineering
JP Morgan
Kraft Foods
Lennar
Liberty Global
London Trust Media (headquarters)
Merrill Lynch
Microsoft
Morgan Stanley
Mosaic Family Wealth
Nationwide Insurance
Nestlé
Newmont Mining Corporation
Nissan Motor Corporation
NBCUniversal
Oracle Corp.
PepsiCo
Plante Moran
ProBuild
Protective Life
Red Robin, (Headquarters)
ReportsNow, (Headquarters)
RE/MAX, (Headquarters)
RSM US
SAP
Shaw Group
Sprint
Stanley Consultants
Starz Entertainment
The CE Shop
TeleTech
URS Corp.
United Launch Alliance
VF Corporation, (Temporary Headquarters)
Wachovia Securities
Western Union
WideOpenWest
Workiva
WSP Global
XO Communications
Zoom Video Communications

Other business parks in the same vicinity are Inverness Business Park and Meridian Business Park, located farther south along I-25.

See also List of companies with Denver area operations

The Denver Tech Center is symbolized by the DTC Identity Monument, which sits immediately between I-25 and DTC Parkway in Greenwood Village. The monument was designed by Barber Architecture and is meant to resemble the framework of a skyscraper.

References

External links
Denver Tech Center Info - Search 6,000+ Denver Tech Center area businesses with results plotted on interactive maps.
 A list of companies with offices (HQ and regional) in the Denver Tech Center and Inverness business parks

Business parks of the United States
Greenwood Village, Colorado
Economy of Denver
Geography of Denver
Buildings and structures in Arapahoe County, Colorado